Thomas Walker (3 April 1854 – 28 August 1925) was an English first-class cricketer, who played in fourteen matches for Yorkshire County Cricket Club between 1879 and 1880.

Born in Holbeck, Leeds, Yorkshire, England, Walker was a right-hand batsman, who scored 189 runs in twenty four first-class innings, at an average of 8.59.  Walker's highest score was 30, and he took three catches in the field.

Wilson died in August 1925, in Roundhay, Leeds, aged 71.

References

External links
Cricinfo Profile

1854 births
1925 deaths
People from Holbeck
Yorkshire cricketers
English cricketers